Philotheca eremicola is a species of flowering plant in the family Rutaceae and is endemic to Western Australia. It is a small shrub similar to Philotheca coateana but has smaller leaves and different sepals.

Description
The ten stamens are free from each other and hairy.

Taxonomy and naming
Philotheca eremicola was first formally described in 1998 by Paul Wilson in the journal Nuytsia from specimens collected by D.J. Pearson near the Tjirrkarli Community in the Gibson Desert.

Distribution
This species of philotheca is only known from the type location in the Gibson Desert.

Conservation status
This species is classified as "Priority One" by the Government of Western Australia Department of Parks and Wildlife, meaning that it is known from only one or a few locations which are potentially at risk.

References

eremicola
Flora of Western Australia
Sapindales of Australia
Plants described in 1998
Taxa named by Paul G. Wilson